Zingo is a Swedish soft drink, with a carbonated orange flavor. Zingo was introduced during the 1950s as Ingo-dricka ("Ingo drink"), named after the boxer Ingemar "Ingo" Johansson. 
After Ingo lost the world championship in heavy weight boxing, the drink was renamed to Zingo in 1962. Originally Zingo was produced in Norrköping, Sweden by Pripps. Pripps was bought by Carlsberg in 2000 and they continue to manufacture Zingo.

Sources
 Carlsberg Sweden
 Swedish Wikipedia on Zingo

See also
 Zingo-nostalgi!

Soft drinks
Swedish drinks